Furongxiu (14th-century) was a famous Chinese opera singer and actress.

Furongxiu was from Jinhua, but her private life is unknown. As an artist, she was famous in contemporary China. She was active as an opera singer within the xiaoling opera, as well as dramatic actress within the zaju theater. The contemporary art critic Xia Tingzhi (1316-1370) described her as one of the elite members of stage art, famed for her talent within both opera and drama.

References 
 Lily Xiao Hong Lee, Sue Wiles: Biographical Dictionary of Chinese Women, Volume II: Tang Through Ming 618 - 1644

14th-century Chinese people
14th-century Chinese actresses
14th-century Chinese women
Singers from Zhejiang
Actresses from Zhejiang
People from Jinhua
Yuan dynasty actors